Floyd Walter Konetsky (May 26, 1920 – November 15, 1987) was an American college and professional football player who was an end in the National Football League (NFL) and All-America Football Conference (AAFC) for three seasons during the 1940s.  Konetsky played college football for the University of Florida, and thereafter, he played professionally for the NFL's Cleveland Rams and AAFC's Baltimore Colts.

Early years 

He was born in Marianna, Pennsylvania.  Konetsky attended German Township High School in McCleelandtown, Pennsylvania.  He was captain of the German Township high school football team in 1938.  Konetsky was the younger brother of Ted Konetsky, who was a prominent lineman for the Pittsburgh Panthers football team from 1937 to 1939.

College career 

Konetsky accepted an athletic scholarship to attend the University of Florida in Gainesville, Florida, where he played for coach Josh Cody and coach Tom Lieb's Florida Gators football teams from 1939 to 1941.  Konetsky graduated from the University of Florida with a bachelor's degree in 1943.

Professional career 

During the Rams' 1945 NFL championship season, he played in all ten regular season games and started four of them. During his two seasons with the Rams, he played in eighteen games, started ten of them, and had one interception return for 15 yards. He signed with Baltimore Colts in October 1947, and played in six games for them, all but one in reserve.

See also 

 Florida Gators football, 1940–49
 History of the St. Louis Rams
 List of Florida Gators in the NFL Draft
 List of University of Florida alumni

References

Bibliography 
 Carlson, Norm, University of Florida Football Vault: The History of the Florida Gators, Whitman Publishing, LLC, Atlanta, Georgia (2007).  .
 Golenbock, Peter, Go Gators!  An Oral History of Florida's Pursuit of Gridiron Glory, Legends Publishing, LLC, St. Petersburg, Florida (2002).  .
 Hairston, Jack, Tales from the Gator Swamp: A Collection of the Greatest Gator Stories Ever Told, Sports Publishing, LLC, Champaign, Illinois (2002).  .
 McCarthy, Kevin M.,  Fightin' Gators: A History of University of Florida Football, Arcadia Publishing, Mount Pleasant, South Carolina (2000).  .
 McEwen, Tom, The Gators: A Story of Florida Football, The Strode Publishers, Huntsville, Alabama (1974).  .
 Nash, Noel, ed., The Gainesville Sun Presents The Greatest Moments in Florida Gators Football, Sports Publishing, Inc., Champaign, Illinois (1998).  .

1920 births
1987 deaths
People from Washington County, Pennsylvania
Sportspeople from the Pittsburgh metropolitan area
Players of American football from Pennsylvania
American football ends
Florida Gators football players
Cleveland Rams players
Baltimore Colts (1947–1950) players